Jambi is the capital and largest city of the Indonesian province of Jambi. Located on the island of Sumatra, the city is a busy port on the Batang Hari River and an oil- and rubber-producing centre.

Nearby towns and villages include Mendalo, Kinati, Padang, Tanjungjohor, Paalmerah, and Muarakumpe. Jambi City itself is an enclave within Muaro Jambi Regency.

Jambi is served by the Sultan Thaha Airport.

History
Jambi City was denoted as the administrative capital of the Jambi autonomic area by the Governor of Sumatra on 17 May 1946. In 1956, Jambi City was given its city status, and eventually became the capital of Jambi province on 6 January 1957.

Geography
Jambi City is located at the south-western portion of the Sumatran Basin, a low-lying area in Eastern Sumatra with an altitude of 0 to 60m above sea level.

Demographics

Jambi city is the most populated city in Jambi Province, with 606,200 inhabitants (17% of the province's population) living in this city in 2020. The city is a very diverse and multi-ethnic, consist of Jambi Malays (27.84%), Javanese (22.05%), Minangkabau (12.64%), Malays (11.47%), Chinese (6.82%), Batak (6.62%), Sundanese (4.47%), and Bugis (2.03%).

Administrative districts
At the time of the 2010 Census, the city of Jambi was subdivided into eight administrative districts (kecamatan), but since 2010, three additional districts have been added by the splitting of existing districts - Alam Barajo, Danau Sipin and Paal Merah. The districts are listed below with their areas and their populations at the 2010 Census and 2020 Census. The table also includes the locations of the district administrative centres, and the number of administrative villages (urban kelurahan) in each district.

Note: (a) the 2010 populations of these new districts are included with the figure for the district from which they were cut.

Climate
The level of humidity ranges from 82 to 28%. The dry season lasts from April to September with an average of 16 rainy days a month.

Transportation

The city is served by Sultan Thaha Airport, which has connections to Jakarta, Batam, Palembang, Medan, Bengkulu, Bandar Lampung and Pekanbaru. 
Trans-Sumatran Highway crosses the city. Jambi port is located over Batang Hari River.
Public transportation includes angkot and ojek. Ride sharing services Grab and Gojek also available

Twin towns – sister cities

Jambi City is twinned with:

  Kupang, Indonesia
  Ermera, East Timor
  Ainaro, East Timor
  Kulim, Malaysia

References

External links

Official site
Provinsi Jambi
Sarolangun
Informasi Jambi
Kabar Jambi
Merangin
Tv Jambi
Informasi Jambi
Tentang Jambi
Tv Online Jambi
Pariwisata Jambi
Berita Jambi
Muaro Jambi

 
Populated places in Jambi
Sumatra
Port cities and towns in Indonesia
Provincial capitals in Indonesia
Cities in Indonesia
1956 establishments in Indonesia
Cities in Jambi